The bare-tailed armored tree-rat (Pattonomys occasius) is a species of arboreal rodent in the family Echimyidae. It is found in lowland tropical rainforest east of the Andes in Ecuador and Peru.

References

Pattonomys
Mammals of Ecuador
Mammals of Peru
Rodents of South America
Mammals described in 1921
Taxa named by Oldfield Thomas
Taxonomy articles created by Polbot